Collectanea Hibernica was a history journal published annually by the Franciscan Province of Ireland between 1958 and 2006. It published sources on Irish history and guides to manuscript materials.

External links
Franciscan Province of Ireland
Collectanea Hibernica at JSTOR

Publications established in 1958
Irish history journals
Annual journals
English-language journals
Irish Franciscans